Once Only Imagined is the debut full-length studio album by the Canadian metal band The Agonist.

The video for "Business Suits and Combat Boots" was filmed by acclaimed director David Brodsky (Strapping Young Lad, Gwar, God Forbid) and was released on September 21, 2007. The video was voted the number 6 video of the year 2007 on MTV2's Headbanger's Ball.

Track listing
 All lyrics written by Alissa White-Gluz
 All songs composed by Danny Marino, Alissa White-Gluz, and Chris Kells

Personnel
 The Agonist
Alissa White-Gluz – lead vocals
Danny Marino – guitars
Chris Kells – bass, backing vocals (tracks 3, 6, 7 and 11)

 Additional personnel
Derek Nadon – drums, percussion
Christian Donaldson – vocals (track 6)

Production
Produced by Christian Donalson, Alissa White-Gluz, Danny Marino and Chris Kells (2005–2006)
Recorder at Studio Garage with Christian Donaldson (2005–2006)
Mastered by Alan Douches at West Side Music (2006–2007)

References

External links
 www.myspace.com/theagonist

2007 debut albums
Century Media Records albums
The Agonist albums